Zerynthia is a genus of swallowtail butterflies placed in the subfamily Parnassiinae.  The genus has a complex history; a multiplicity of names have been applied to its species.

Species 
Zerynthia consists of the following species:

Taxonomy
See Ackery (1975), Larsen (1973), Kuhna (1977)  Kocak (1975, 1977) 
, de Freina (1979)  
Vazrick Nazari and Felix A. H. Sperling (2007). 
Ackery (1975) pointed out that Zerynthia is a junior synonym of Parnalius Rafinesque, 1815 published as a replacement name for the preoccupied Thais Fabricius and moreover correctly listed by Sherborne (1929) Neave (1940) and Cowan (1970).  Parnalius has subsequently been suppressed cf. The Bulletin of Zoological Nomenclature. 36 (1979): 102)

Synonymy

Zerynthia Ochsenheimer, 1816
Thais Fabricius, 1807 (Systema glossatorum: XI): typus moneat.; junior homonym of Thais Roding, 1789.
Thais Fabricius, 1807 (Mag. fur Insektenkunde 6: 283) type Papilio hypsiphyle Fabricius by monotypy.
Parnalius Rafinesque, 1815 (Analyse Nat.: 128) type by Art. 67 (1): Papilio hypsiphyle Fabricius.
Zerynthia Ochsenheimer, 1816 (Schmett. Europ. 4: 128) type polyxena  Schiff, selected by Scudder; n.n. pro Thais Fabricius.  subspecies polyxena, medisicaste, rumina.
Eugraphis (Dalman i.l.) Billberg, 1820 (Ennum. Ins.: 75) type hypsiphyle Fabricius by monotypy.
Zerinthia Sodovsky, 1837 (Bulletin de la Société Imperiale des Naturalistes de Moscou. 1834 (10): 82: nom. emend. pro Zerynthia Ochs.
Cerynthia Staudinger, 1861 (Staudinger and Wocke: Cat. Lep. Europ. (1): 1: nom. emend.
Zerynthyia Zerny, 1927 (Eos, Madrid 3: 313): nom. emend.
Thays Rocci, 1928 (Boll. Soc. Ent. Ital. 10: 55): nom. emend.
Allancastria Bryk, 1934 (Parnassiana 2: 104) type cerisyi Godart by monotypy: synonymised by Ackery, 1975. NOTE: subsequent researchers have typically not considered Allancastria to be a synonym, and treat it either as a valid genus (e.g. ) or as a valid subgenus within Zerynthia (e.g. ).

References

External links
Tree of Life

 
Papilionidae
Butterfly genera
Taxa named by Ferdinand Ochsenheimer